Jetmir Topalli (born 7 February 1998) is a Kosovan professional footballer who plays as a centre-forward for Süper Lig club İstanbulspor and the Kosovo national team.

Club career

Ballkani
On 13 June 2018, Topalli signed a two-year contract with Football Superleague of Kosovo club Ballkani. On 25 August 2018, he made his debut in a 3–0 home defeat against Llapi after being named in the starting line-up.

Loan at Feronikeli
On 13 June 2019, Topalli joined in a short-time loan with Football Superleague of Kosovo club Feronikeli, only for European competition matches. Twelve days later, he was named as a Feronikeli substitute for the first time in semi-final of 2019–20 UEFA Champions League preliminary round against the Gibraltarian side Lincoln Red Imps. His debut with Feronikeli came on 28 June in final of 2019–20 UEFA Champions League preliminary round against the Andorran side FC Santa Coloma after coming on as a substitute at 67th minute in place of Jean Carioca.

Yeni Malatyaspor
On 13 August 2020, Topalli signed a three-year contract with Süper Lig club Yeni Malatyaspor, and received squad number 98. On 12 September 2020, he made his debut in a 3–0 away defeat against Fatih Karagümrük after coming on as a substitute at 81st minute in place of Umut Bulut.

İstanbulspor
On 31 August 2021, Topalli signed a five-year contract with TFF First League club İstanbulspor.

International career
On 24 December 2019, Topalli received a call-up from Kosovo for the friendly match against Sweden, and made his debut after coming on as a substitute at 46th minute in place of Flamur Kastrati.

Career statistics

Club

International

References

External links

1998 births
Living people
People from Kaçanik
Kosovan footballers
Kosovo international footballers
Kosovan expatriate footballers
Expatriate footballers in Turkey
Kosovan expatriate sportspeople in Turkey
Association football forwards
KF Vushtrria players
Football Superleague of Kosovo players
KF Ballkani players
KF Feronikeli players
Süper Lig players
TFF First League players
Yeni Malatyaspor footballers
İstanbulspor footballers